An election to South Dublin County Council took place on 11 June 2004 as part of that year's Irish local elections. 26 councillors were elected from five electoral divisions using the Single transferable vote system for a five-year term of office.

Results by party

Results by Electoral Area

Clondalkin

Lucan

Tallaght Central

Tallaght South

Terenure-Rathfarnam

External links
 Official website

2004 Irish local elections
2004